Nikolay Yegorovich Makovsky (10 May 1841, Moscow — 18 October 1886, Saint Petersburg) was a Russian painter; one of a quartet of artist siblings that included his brothers Konstantin and Vladimir and his sister Alexandra.

Biography 
His father, Yegor Ivanovich Makovsky, was an accountant by profession, but was also an amateur artist, avid art collector and one of the founders of the Moscow School of Painting, Sculpture and Architecture.

In 1865, he was awarded a silver medal for his work on a small stone church with 150 parishioners. Upon graduation, he was given the title of "Free Artist", which conferred the right to work on construction projects. Shortly thereafter, he became an architect's assistant at the Ministry of the Imperial Court, but eventually gave up his position there to devote all of his time to painting.

In 1870, he became one of the charter members of the "Association of Travelling Art Exhibitions" (Peredvizhniki), but didn't participate fully until 1875. In 1872, he was awarded the designation of "Artist Second-Degree" from the Academy.

From 1873 to 1874, he and his brother Konstantin toured Egypt, then he travelled extensively throughout Russia and Ukraine. He later spent several months at the Russian art colony in Paris, where he worked with Alexey Bogolyubov. From this point on, most of his paintings were shown in travelling exhibitions.

References

External links 

 Nikolay Makovsky @ Russian Painting
 M. Trofimenkov, "Семейное бессознательное" (lit: "The Unconscious Family"). The Artists Makovsky at the Russian Museum from the magazine Kommersant, December 2008, 
 The Artists Makovsky, exhibition at the Russian Museum (2008-2009)

1841 births
1886 deaths
Artists from Moscow
People from Moskovsky Uyezd
Peredvizhniki
Russian painters
Russian male painters
19th-century painters from the Russian Empire
19th-century male artists from the Russian Empire
Moscow School of Painting, Sculpture and Architecture alumni